Hilde Lauer (later Tătaru, born 24 March 1943) is a retired Romanian sprint canoer. She won two medals at the 1964 Olympics with a silver in the K-1 500 m and a bronze in the K-2 500 m event. Domestically she won ten national titles between 1961 and 1969. In 1970 she immigrated to Germany.

References

1943 births
Canoeists at the 1964 Summer Olympics
Living people
Olympic canoeists of Romania
Olympic silver medalists for Romania
Olympic bronze medalists for Romania
Romanian female canoeists
Olympic medalists in canoeing

Medalists at the 1964 Summer Olympics